Call of the Wild is a studio album by Frankie Laine released in 1962 on Columbia Records. It was recorded with the orchestra and chorus conducted by Johnny Williams.

Track listing

References 

1962 albums
Frankie Laine albums
Columbia Records albums